Taheitia alata is a species of very small land snail that has an operculum and lives very near saltwater, a maritime terrestrial gastropod mollusk in the family Truncatellidae. This species is endemic to Guam.

References

Fauna of Guam
Truncatellidae
Gastropods described in 1894
Taxonomy articles created by Polbot